Ben Gallaher is a country music singer-songwriter and recording artist from Pennsylvania. Gallaher signed with Sony Music Nashville in 2017 and released his debut self-titled EP on August 11, 2017. Ben released his debut studio album "Country In The House" on February 24, 2023 under the label Stone Country Records.

Career 
Gallaher started playing guitar and drums at 6 years old. Despite growing up in Pennsylvania, Gallaher always wanted to move to Nashville and attend Belmont University, but he ended up first at Penn State-Mont Alto. He eventually transferred to Belmont University, and graduated in May 2014 with a degree in Entertainment Industry Studies. By that time, he had already shared the stage with headlining acts like Brantley Gilbert, Colt Ford, Craig Campbell, and Frankie Ballard.

During a semester at Belmont, a professor would send in Gallaher's music to Sony Music, which resulted in a record deal. In 2014, Gallaher signed a record deal with Sony Music Nashville and is currently touring, writing, and in the studio.

The Pennsylvania-native and Eagle scout released his first EP with Sony on August 11, 2017. Gallaher has performed for inmates in Pennsylvania state prisons for the past 7 years on his annual "Barbed Tour." Ben parted ways with Sony Nashville in January 2019.

Discography
EPs

Albums

References

External links

American country singer-songwriters
American male singer-songwriters
Singer-songwriters from Pennsylvania
Living people
1992 births
People from Cumberland County, Pennsylvania
21st-century American singers
Country musicians from Pennsylvania
21st-century American male singers